Chamaesaracha coronopus (formerly Solanum coronopus), commonly called greenleaf five eyes, is a plant in the nightshade family (Solanaceae) found in dry open flat areas from southeastern California to Kansas and western Texas.

References

Physaleae
Flora of the United States